Afsana may refer to:

 Afsana (name), a female given name in Afghanistan
 Afsana (film), a 1951 Bollywood film directed by Baldev Raj Chopra
 One Thousand and One Nights, short stories derived from "Hezār Afsān" (Persian: هزار افسان, lit. A Thousand Tales)